Jake "Greasy Thumb" Guzik (March 20, 1886 – February 21, 1956) was the financial and legal advisor, and later political "greaser," for the Chicago Outfit.

Early life
Guzik was born near Kraków, Kingdom of Galicia and Lodomeria, Austria-Hungary on March 20, 1886, to parents who were German Jews from Katowitz, in Prussian Silesia. Guzik emigrated to the United States in the early 20th century and later became involved in prostitution, and allegedly sexual slavery, in the South Side of Chicago's Levee red light district with his brother Harry, eventually driving North Side Gang-linked rival Jack Zuta out of business. He later became a powerful political boss and "fixer", who operated out of St. Hubert's Old English Grill and Chop House. There, Guzik received "bagmen," who delivered scheduled payoffs to various police precincts and city officials.

Chicago Outfit
In the early 1920s, Guzik, supposedly overhearing a plan to murder Al Capone, informed him and later allied with the Chicago Outfit. Starting under Capone, Guzik was the trusted treasurer and financial wizard of the Outfit. Guzik worked for Capone, and later Paul "the Waiter" Ricca and Tony Accardo. Because Guzik was incapable of using a gun or killing anyone, Capone protected him and once killed a man for him. In May 1924, Guzik got into an argument with a freelance hijacker named Joe Howard, who slapped and kicked him around. Incapable of physical resistance, Guzik related to Capone what had happened. Capone charged out in search of Howard and ran him down in Heinie Jacob's saloon on South Wabash Avenue, where Howard was bragging about the way he had "made the little Jew whine." When Howard saw Capone, he held out his hand and said, "Hello, Al." Capone instead grabbed Howard's shoulders and shook him violently, demanding to know why Howard had mistreated his friend. "Go back to your girls, you dago pimp," Howard replied. Capone then wordlessly drew a revolver, jammed it into his face, and, after several seconds, emptied it into him.

Capone quickly came to trust Guzik's advice in the various gang wars that developed as he tried to organize Chicago. Guzik also served as the mob's principal bagman in payoffs to police and politicians, hence the origin of the nickname Greasy Thumb. Years later, as Capone was in failing health, it was Guzik who saw to it that Capone and his family never wanted for anything.

During the 1940s and 1950s, when the national syndicate was dominated by the Big Six, Guzik and Accardo flew east weekly to meet with the other heads of the organization: Joe Adonis, Frank Costello, Meyer Lansky and Longy Zwillman. The only serious legal problems that Guzik ever faced were with the IRS, and he eventually spent a few years in prison. At the Kefauver Committee hearings, he pleaded the Fifth Amendment on the grounds that any response to the questions might "discriminate against me."

Guzik died of a myocardial infarction on February 21, 1956, while in bed at a South Side Chicago apartment he rented under the name Jack Arnold. He was 69. At his funeral services, more Italians were in attendance at the synagogue than ever before in its history.

In television
Jake Guzik is a major figure in the 1959 television show The Untouchables, wherein he is portrayed by Nehemiah Persoff. Guzik was introduced in the two-hour pilot, in which he was portrayed by Bern Hoffman, and returned in the first episode as the brains behind the Chicago Outfit after Al Capone's conviction. He ultimately appeared in four episodes, portrayed by Persoff in all four.

Jake Guzik appears in the HBO show Boardwalk Empire, wherein he is portrayed by Joe Caniano. His incident with Joe Howard was dramatized in an episode.

References
Kelly, Robert J. Encyclopedia of Organized Crime in the United States. Westport, Connecticut: Greenwood Press, 2000. 
Sifakis, Carl. The Mafia Encyclopedia. New York: Da Capo Press, 2005. 
Sifakis, Carl. The Encyclopedia of American Crime. New York: Facts on File Inc., 2001.

Notes

Further reading
Binder, John. The Chicago Outfit. Arcadia Publishing, 2003. 
Johnson, Curt and R. Craig Sautter. The Wicked City: Chicago from Kenna to Capone. New York: Da Capo Press, 1998. 
Reppetto, Thomas A. American Mafia: A History of Its Rise to Power. New York: Henry Holt & Co., 2004. 
Almog, Oz, Kosher Nostra Jüdische Gangster in Amerika, 1890–1980 ; Jüdischen Museum der Stadt Wien ; 2003, Text Oz Almog, Erich Metz,

External links

AmericanMafia.com - 26 Mafia Cities: Chicago, IL by John J. Binder

1886 births
1956 deaths
Chicago Outfit mobsters
Al Capone associates
American people convicted of tax crimes
American people of Polish-Jewish descent
Jewish American gangsters
Prohibition-era gangsters
Austro-Hungarian emigrants to the United States